Beamhurst Lane is a village in Staffordshire, England.

Villages in Staffordshire